These are the films directed by the pioneering American filmmaker D. W. Griffith (1875–1948).  According to IMDb, he directed 518 films between 1908 and 1931.

1908

 The Adventures of Dollie
 The Fight for Freedom (director disputed)
 The Tavern Keeper's Daughter
 The Black Viper
 The Red Man and the Child
 Deceived Slumming Party
 The Bandit's Waterloo
 A Calamitous Elopement
 The Greaser's Gauntlet
 The Man and the Woman
 The Fatal Hour
 For Love of Gold
 Balked at the Altar
 For a Wife's Honor
 Betrayed by a Handprint
 Monday Morning in a Coney Island Police Court
 The Girl and the Outlaw
 Behind the Scenes
 The Red Girl
 The Heart of O'Yama
 Where the Breakers Roar
 A Smoked Husband
 The Stolen Jewels
 The Devil
 The Zulu's Heart
 Father Gets in the Game
 Ingomar, the Barbarian
 The Vaquero's Vow
 The Planter's Wife
 Romance of a Jewess
 The Call of the Wild
 Concealing a Burglar
 After Many Years
 The Pirate's Gold
 The Taming of the Shrew
 The Guerrilla
 The Song of the Shirt
 The Ingrate
 A Woman's Way
 The Clubman and the Tramp
 Money Mad
 The Valet's Wife
 The Feud and the Turkey
 The Reckoning
 The Test of Friendship
 An Awful Moment
 The Christmas Burglars
 Mr. Jones at the Ball
 The Helping Hand

1909

 One Touch of Nature
 The Maniac Cook
 Mrs. Jones Entertains
 The Honor of Thieves
 Love Finds a Way
 The Sacrifice
 A Rural Elopement
 Those Boys!
 The Criminal Hypnotist
 The Fascinating Mrs. Francis
 Mr. Jones Has a Card Party
 Those Awful Hats
 The Welcome Burglar
 The Cord of Life
 The Girls and Daddy
 The Brahma Diamond
 Edgar Allen Poe
 A Wreath in Time
 Tragic Love
 The Curtain Pole
 His Ward's Love
 The Joneses Have Amateur Theatricals
 The Hindoo Dagger
 The Politician's Love Story
 The Golden Louis
 At the Altar
 The Prussian Spy
 His Wife's Mother
 A Fool's Revenge
 The Wooden Leg
 The Roue's Heart
 The Salvation Army Lass
 The Lure of the Gown
 I Did It
 The Voice of the Violin
 The Deception
 And a Little Child Shall Lead Them
 A Burglar's Mistake
 The Medicine Bottle
 Jones and His New Neighbors
 A Drunkard's Reformation
 Trying to Get Arrested
 The Road to the Heart
 A Rude Hostess
 Schneider's Anti-Noise Crusade
 The Winning Coat
 A Sound Sleeper
 Confidence
 A Troublesome Satchel
 Lady Helen's Escapade
 The Drive for a Life
 Twin Brothers
 Lucky Jim
 Tis an Ill Wind That Blows No Good
 The Suicide Club
 The Eavesdropper
 One Busy Hour
 The Note in the Shoe
 Jones and the Lady Book Agent
 The French Duel
 A Baby's Shoe
 The Jilt
 Resurrection
 Two Memories
 Eloping with Auntie
 The Cricket on the Hearth
 His Duty
 Eradicating Aunty
 What Drink Did
 The Violin Maker of Cremona
 A New Trick
 The Lonely Villa
 The Son's Return
 Her First Biscuits
 The Faded Lilies
 Was Justice Served?
 The Peachbasket Hat
 The Mexican Sweethearts
 The Way of Man
 The Necklace
 The Message
 The Country Doctor
 The Cardinal's Conspiracy
 Tender Hearts
 The Friend of the Family
 The Renunciation
 Sweet and Twenty
 Jealousy and the Man
 A Convict's Sacrifice
 The Slave
 A Strange Meeting
 The Mended Lute
 They Would Elope
 Jones' Burglar
 The Better Way
 With Her Card
 Mrs. Jones' Lover or I Want My Hat
 His Wife's Visitor
 The Indian Runner's Romance
 The Seventh Day
 Oh, Uncle!
 Pranks
 The Mills of the Gods
 The Sealed Room
 The Little Darling
 The Hessian Renegades
 Comata, the Sioux
 Getting Even
 The Children's Friend
 The Broken Locket
 In Old Kentucky
 A Fair Exchange
 Leather Stocking
 Wanted, a Child
 The Awakening
 Pippa Passes or The Song of Conscience
 Fools of Fate
 The Little Teacher
 A Change of Heart
 His Lost Love
 The Expiation
 In the Watches of the Night
 Lines of White on a Sullen Sea
 What's Your Hurry?
 The Gibson Goddess
 Nursing a Viper
 The Restoration
 The Light That Came
 Two Women and a Man
 A Sweet Revenge
 A Midnight Adventure
 The Open Gate
 The Mountaineer's Honor
 The Trick That Failed
 In the Window Recess
 The Death Disc: A Story of the Cromwellian Period
 Through the Breakers
 The Red Man's View
 A Corner in Wheat
 The Test
 In a Hempen Bag
 A Trap for Santa Claus
 In Little Italy
 To Save Her Soul
 The Day After
 Choosing a Husband
 The Heart of an Outlaw
 Mamma
 Bill Sharkey's Last Game

1910

 The Rocky Road
 The Dancing Girl of Butte
 Her Terrible Ordeal
 On the Reef
 The Call
 The Honor of His Family
 The Last Deal
 The Cloister's Touch
 The Woman from Mellon's
 The Course of True Love
 The Duke's Plan
 One Night and Then
 The Englishman and the Girl
 His Last Burglary
 Taming a Husband
 The Final Settlement
 The Newlyweds
 The Thread of Destiny
 In Old California
 The Man
 The Converts
 Faithful
 The Twisted Trail
 Gold Is Not All
 The Smoker (director disputed)
 His Last Dollar
 The Two Brothers
 As It Is In Life
 A Rich Revenge
 A Romance of the Western Hills
 Thou Shalt Not
 The Tenderfoot's Triumph (director disputed)
 The Way of the World
 Up a Tree (director disputed)
 The Gold Seekers
 The Unchanging Sea
 Love Among the Roses
 Over Silent Paths
 An Affair of Hearts (director disputed)
 Ramona
 A Knot in the Plot (director disputed)
 The Impalement
 In the Season of Buds
 The Purgation
 A Child of the Ghetto
 A Victim of Jealousy
 In the Border States
 The Face at the Window
 Never Again (director disputed)
 May and December (director disputed)
 The Marked Time-Table
 A Child's Impulse
 Muggsy's First Sweetheart
 A Midnight Cupid
 What the Daisy Said
 A Child's Faith
 A Flash of Light
 Serious Sixteen
 As the Bells Rang Out!
 The Call to Arms
 Unexpected Help
 An Arcadian Maid
 Her Father's Pride
 The House with Closed Shutters (Civil War story)
 A Salutary Lesson
 The Usurer
 An Old Story with a New Ending (director disputed)
 The Sorrows of the Unfaithful
 Wilful Peggy
 The Modern Prodigal
 The Affair of an Egg (director disputed)
 A Summer Idyll
 Little Angels of Luck
 A Mohawk's Way
 In Life's Cycle
 A Summer Tragedy (director disputed)
 The Oath and the Man
 Rose O'Salem-Town
 Examination Day at School
 The Iconoclast
 That Chink at Golden Gulch
 The Broken Doll
 The Banker's Daughters
 The Message of the Violin
 Two Little Waifs
 Waiter No. 5
 The Fugitive
 Simple Charity
 Sunshine Sue
 The Song of the Wildwood Flute
 His New Lid (director disputed)
 A Plain Song
 A Child's Stratagem
 The Golden Supper
 His Sister-In-Law
 The Lesson
 White Roses (director disputed)
 Winning Back His Love

1911

 Flaming Arrows
 The Two Paths
 When a Man Loves
 The Italian Barber
 His Trust
 His Trust Fulfilled
 Fate's Turning
 The Poor Sick Men (director disputed)
 A Wreath of Orange Blossoms
 Three Sisters
 Heart Beats of Long Ago
 What Shall We Do with Our Old?
 Fisher Folks
 The Diamond Star
 His Daughter
 The Lily of the Tenements
 The Heart of a Savage
 A Decree of Destiny
 Conscience
 Was He a Coward?
 Teaching Dad to Like Her
 The Lonedale Operator
 The Spanish Gypsy
 The Broken Cross
 The Chief's Daughter
 Paradise Lost (director disputed)
 Madame Rex
 A Knight of the Road
 His Mother's Scarf
 How She Triumphed
 The Two Sides
 In the Days of '49
 The New Dress
 The Crooked Road
 The White Rose of the Wilds
 A Romany Tragedy
 The Smile of a Child
 Enoch Arden: Part I
 Enoch Arden: Part II
 The Primal Call
 Her Sacrifice
 Fighting Blood
 The Thief and the Girl
 The Jealous Husband
 Bobby, the Coward
 The Indian Brothers
 A Country Cupid
 The Last Drop of Water
 Out from the Shadow
 The Ruling Passion
 The Sorrowful Example
 The Blind Princess and the Poet
 The Rose of Kentucky
 Swords and Hearts
 The Stuff Heroes Are Made Of
 The Old Confectioner's Mistake
 The Squaw's Love
 Dan the Dandy
 The Revenue Man and the Girl
 Her Awakening
 The Making of a Man
 Italian Blood
 The Unveiling
 The Adventures of Billy
 The Long Road
 Love in the Hills
 The Battle (Civil War story)
 The Trail of Books
 Through Darkened Vales
 The Miser's Heart
 Sunshine Through the Dark
 A Woman Scorned
 The Failure
 Saved from Himself
 As in a Looking Glass
 A Terrible Discovery
 The Voice of the Child

1912

 Grannie
 The Baby and the Stork
 A Tale of the Wilderness
 The Eternal Mother
 The Old Bookkeeper
 For His Son
 A Blot on the 'Scutcheon
 The Transformation of Mike
 A Sister's Love
 Billy's Stratagem
 The Mender of Nets
 Under Burning Skies
 The Sunbeam
 A Siren of Impulse
 A String of Pearls
 The Girl and Her Trust
 Iola's Promise
 The Root of Evil
 The Goddess of Sagebrush Gulch
 The Punishment
 Fate's Interception
 The Female of the Species
 Just Like a Woman
 One Is Business, the Other Crime
 The Lesser Evil
 The Old Actor
 A Lodging for the Night
 His Lesson
 When Kings Were the Law
 A Beast at Bay
 An Outcast Among Outcasts
 Home Folks
 A Temporary Truce
 Lena and the Geese
 The Spirit Awakened
 The School Teacher and the Waif
 Man's Lust for Gold
 An Indian Summer
 Man's Genesis
 Heaven Avenges
 The Sands of Dee
 Black Sheep
 The Narrow Road
 A Child's Remorse
 The Inner Circle
 A Change of Spirit
 A Pueblo Romance
 A Pueblo Legend
 In the North Woods
 An Unseen Enemy
 Blind Love
 Two Daughters of Eve
 Friends
 So Near, yet So Far
 A Feud in the Kentucky Hills
 The Chief's Blanket
 In the Aisles of the Wild
 The One She Loved
 The Painted Lady
 The Musketeers of Pig Alley
 Heredity
 The Massacre
 Gold and Glitter
 My Baby
 The Informer
 Brutality
 The New York Hat
 My Hero
 The Burglar's Dilemma
 A Cry for Help
 The God Within

1913

 Three Friends
 The Telephone Girl and the Lady
 An Adventure in the Autumn Woods
 The Tender Hearted Boy
 A Misappropriated Turkey
 Brothers
 Oil and Water
 Drink's Lure
 A Chance Deception
 Love in an Apartment Hotel
 Broken Ways
 A Girl's Stratagem
 The Unwelcome Guest
 Near to Earth
 Fate
 A Welcome Intruder
 The Sheriff's Baby
 The Hero of Little Italy
 The Perfidy of Mary
 The Little Tease
 A Misunderstood Boy
 The Left-Handed Man
 The Lady and the Mouse
 If We Only Knew
 The Wanderer
 The Stolen Loaf
 The House of Darkness
 The Yaqui Cur
 Just Gold
 His Mother's Son
 The Ranchero's Revenge
 A Timely Interception
 Death's Marathon
 The Mothering Heart
 Her Mother's Oath
 The Sorrowful Shore
 The Reformers; or, The Lost Art of Minding One's Business
 The Enemy's Baby
 The Mistake
 The Coming of Angelo
 Two Men of the Desert
 The Adopted Brother
 Madonna of the Storm
 The Battle at Elderbush Gulch
 The Conscience of Hassan Bey

1914

 Waifs
 Judith of Bethulia
 The Battle of the Sexes
 The Great Leap; Until Death Do Us Part
 Brute Force
 Home, Sweet Home
 The Escape
 The Avenging Conscience: or 'Thou Shalt Not Kill'
 The Dishonored Medal

1915
 The Birth of a Nation

1916
 A Day with Governor Whitman
 Intolerance

1918

 Hearts of the World
 The Great Love

 Lillian Gish in a Liberty Loan Appeal
 The Greatest Thing in Life

1919

 The World of Columbus
 A Romance of Happy Valley
 The Girl Who Stayed at Home
 Broken Blossoms
 True Heart Susie

 The Fall of Babylon (re-edited version of said sequence from Intolerance)
 The Mother and the Law (re-edited version of said sequence from Intolerance)
 Scarlet Days
 The Greatest Question

1920

 The Idol Dancer
 Remodeling Her Husband (director disputed)
 The Love Flower
 Way Down East

1921

 Dream Street
 Orphans of the Storm

1922

 One Exciting Night
 Mammy's Boy (never completed; remade as His Darker Self by another director in 1924)

1923

 The White Rose

1924

 America
 Isn't Life Wonderful

1925

 Sally of the Sawdust
 That Royle Girl

1926

 The Sorrows of Satan

1927

 Topsy and Eva (co-director, uncredited)

1928

 Drums of Love
 The Battle of the Sexes

1929

 Lady of the Pavements

1930

 Abraham Lincoln (first Griffith sound film)

1931

 The Struggle (last film)

References
 

Griffith, D. W.
Filmography